Pourya, Poorya, Pooria, Pouria, or Pooriya, or Porya or Poria (Persian:پوریا; Avestan: Pouruyô, Pourya) a Persian masculine name with the Avestic root Pouruyô, meaning: first; foremost; most ancient. 

Notable people with the given name include:

 Pourya-ye Vali
 Pouria Fayazi
 Pouria Poursorkh
 Pouria Norouzian

References 

Persian masculine given names